The enzyme protein phosphatase methylesterase-1 (EC 3.1.1.89, PME-1, PPME1; systematic name (phosphatase 2A protein)-leucine ester acylhydrolase  catalyses the reaction

 [phosphatase 2A protein]-leucine methyl ester + H2O  [phosphatase 2A protein]-leucine + methanol

A key regulator of protein phosphatase 2A.

References

External links 
 

EC 3.1.1